William Hayley Mason (18 April 1811 – 24 January 1865) was an English cricketer. Mason's batting style is unknown. He was born at Chichester, Sussex.

Mason made his first-class debut for Sussex against England in 1834 at the Royal New Ground, Brighton. Mason made five first-class appearances for Sussex prior to the formation of Sussex County Cricket Club in August 1839. Mason first appeared for Sussex County Cricket Club against Kent in 1841, with him making four further first-class appearances for the County Cricket Club, with his final appearance coming against Kent. In total, Mason played eleven first-class matches for Sussex, before and after the formation of the county club, scoring 127 runs at an average of 6.04, with a high score of 38.

He died at the city of his birth on 24 January 1865.

References

External links
William Mason at ESPNcricinfo
William Mason at CricketArchive

1811 births
1865 deaths
Sportspeople from Chichester
English cricketers
Sussex cricketers